The Poppy Jasper International Film Festival was founded in 2005 by L. Mattock Scariot in the city of Morgan Hill, California. Poppy Jasper is an annual event produced by volunteers as part of Poppy Jasper, Inc., a 501(c)(3) nonprofit organization. The event is fourteen days of online and person film screenings, speaker panels and awards

MovieMaker Magazine named Poppy Jasper to its list of 25 Film Festivals Worth the Entry Fee.

References

Film festivals in California